Daf Sar (also Romanized as Dāf Sār; also known as Davsar) is a village in Pasikhan Rural District, in the Central District of Rasht County, Gilan Province, Iran. At the 2006 census, its population was 527, in 140 families.

References 

Populated places in Rasht County